Plate smashing is a Greek custom involving the intentional smashing of plates or glasses during celebratory occasions. In popular culture, the practice is most typical of foreigners' stereotypical image of Greece, and while it occurs more rarely today, it continues to be seen on certain occasions, such as weddings, although plaster plates are more likely to be used.

History in Greece

Ancient and medieval
The custom probably derives from an ancient practice of ritually "killing" plates on mourning occasions, as a means of dealing with loss. Breaking plates may also be related to the ancient practice of conspicuous consumption, a display of one's wealth, as plates or glasses are thrown into a fireplace following a banquet instead of being washed and reused.

Modern times
In 1969, the military dictatorship of Georgios Papadopoulos, that had suspended democracy and ruled Greece autocratically from 1967 to 1974, banned plate smashing. Nowadays specially-produced plaster plates are used. Another modern variation on the custom is for diners at small Greek restaurants or tavernas to buy trays of flowers that they can throw at singers and each other.

In popular culture
 In the Hazell episode "Hazell goes to the Dogs" (1978) Hazell stakes out a Greek Restaurant while his drunken assistant smashes plates as the proprietor performs a Greek dance. This is an accurate representation of 1970s stereotyping of Greeks, Greek restaurants and foreign cultures in general.   
 In the Three's Company episode "Opening Night," (November 16, 1982) Larry Dallas invites his family, visiting from Greece, to Jack's Bistro. The large family gathering ends with the Greek celebratory custom of the breaking of plates. Reluctant at first because of all the money it will cost to replace the plates, Jack joins in the celebration when Larry says they will cover the bill for each plate. Jack then looks at Janet who shows him the final cost of all the plates that were broken. Jack, while clenching the remaining two plates he owns, throws them up in the air and says "Opa!" and lets them break as well.
 In Part I of The Love Boat S6 E18 episode (February 5, 1983) titled: "Isaac's Aegean Affair/The Captain and the Kid/Poor Rich Man/The Dean and the Flunkee," Gopher initiates plate smashing in a Greek restaurant.
 In the Full House episode, "Greek Week", there is a scene at a Greek family party where Rebecca Donaldson smashes one plate. Then Joey Gladstone leads the crowds in plate smashing while Danny Tanner frantically tries to clean up the broken plates off the floor.
 In the Frasier episode "Beware of Greeks," (March 17, 1998), Frasier's Greek cousin is getting married and his cousin's mother smashes plates at the wedding reception.
 In the Perfect Strangers (TV series) episode "Grandpa" (S06e14), several plates are being smashed during the last scene of the episode in the course of a celebration taking place in a Greek restaurant. 
 In Ned's Declassified School Survival Guide, episode 2.6 (November 12, 2005 ), Coconut Head smashes a plate on his head for his presentation on Greece.
 The 2009 Australian stop motion animated dark comedy film Mary and Max features a plate smashing scene.
 In Packed to the Rafters, episode 4.1 (February 8, 2011), the character Nick 'Carbo' Karandonis and his fiancée have an engagement party which includes smashing plaster plates and the mistaken smashing of porcelain plates.
 In Come Dine with Me Canada, episode 2.16 (October 3, 2011), the evening ended with plate smashing "in keeping with the Greek ritual."
 In Kitchen Cabinet, episode 2.3 (July 16, 2013), independent Australian Senator Nick Xenophon and host Annabel Crabb end a dinner discussion at a Greek "yiros" restaurant with an impromptu plate smashing.
 In Friday Night Dinner, episode 2.6 (November 11, 2012), the character Jim smashes a plate believing it to be a Jewish tradition.
 In an ESPN This is SportsCenter ad, anchors Stephen A. Smith and Neil Everett smash plates for Greek-born basketball player Giannis Antetokounmpo, causing him to remind them, "nobody actually does that in Greece."
 In the 2001 film, The Wedding Planner, members of a wedding reception are seen smashing plates and cheering "Opa!", much to Penny's chagrin as she tries to save the plates. However, upon learning that her colleague Mary has finally made a romantic connection, Penny absentmindedly drops a stack of plates in enjoyment. Some party-goers see this and cheer before carrying Penny above their heads in celebration.
 For one of two tasks in the final detour of The Amazing Race 33, teams took turns breaking one plate at a time during a band performance until the music stopped or a miniature clue was found within the debris.

See also
Zeibekiko, a Greek folk dance by the groom
Breaking the glass at Jewish weddings
Funeral practices and burial customs in the Philippines
Marriage and wedding customs in Greece
Marriage and wedding customs in the Philippines
Nightclubs in Greece

External links
"Kefi - The Spirit of Greece," about.com.
"Having a Smashing Time in Greece.  Why do Greeks break plates?," about.com.
"Breaking Plates in Greek Tavernas," greecetravel.com

Greek culture